Amanda Wilcox Patterson born December 28, 1983), who went by the stage name Amanda Noelle, is an American Christian musician and worship leader from Russell, Kentucky, who plays a Christian pop style of contemporary worship music. She was part of the group, Kimber Rising, with her sister, before she went solo, releasing, Beautiful Name, in 2013.

Early and personal life
She was born, Amanda Noelle Wilcox, on December 28, 1983, and she was raised in Russell, Kentucky, by parents, Jim and Lisa Wilcox, who are still worship leaders at their church, First Baptist Church Russell. She was diagnosed with cancer in 2014.

Music career
She started her music recording career in 2008, when she was in a group, Kimber Rising, with her sister and one more member, while they just release an extended play. Her subsequent release, a solo extended play, Beautiful Name, was released on August 20, 2013, with Save the City Records.

Discography
EPsBeautiful Name'' (August 20, 2013)

References

External links
 New Release Today artist profile

1982 births
Living people
American performers of Christian music
Musicians from Kentucky
Songwriters from Kentucky
People from Greenup County, Kentucky